Nicolás Zerba (born 13 June 1999) is a Argentine professional volleyball player. He is a member of the Argentina national team, and represented his country at the 2022 World Championship. At the professional club level, he plays for PSG Stal Nysa.

Honours

Clubs
 CSV South American Club Championship
  Belo Horizonte 2019 – with UPCN Vóley Club
  Contagem 2020 – with UPCN Vóley Club

 CEV Challenge Cup
  2021/2022 – with Narbonne Volley  

 National championships
 2017/2018  Argentine Championship, with UPCN Vóley Club
 2018/2019  Argentine Cup, with UPCN Vóley Club

Youth national team
 2016  CSV U19 South American Championship
 2018  CSV U21 South American Championship

Individual awards
 2016: CSV U19 South American Championship – Best Middle Blocker

References

External links
 
 Player profile at PlusLiga.pl 
 Player profile at Volleybox.net

1999 births
Living people
Volleyball players from Buenos Aires
Argentine men's volleyball players
Argentine expatriate sportspeople in France
Expatriate volleyball players in France
Argentine expatriate sportspeople in Poland
Expatriate volleyball players in Poland
Stal Nysa players
Middle blockers